Hasholme is a hamlet in the East Riding of Yorkshire, England. It lies to the north of the River Foulness.

Hasholme forms part of the civil parish of Holme-on-Spalding-Moor.

References

Villages in the East Riding of Yorkshire